In mathematics, the Pettis integral or Gelfand–Pettis integral, named after Israel M. Gelfand and Billy James Pettis, extends the definition of the Lebesgue integral to vector-valued functions on a measure space, by exploiting duality. The integral was introduced by Gelfand for the case when the measure space is an interval with Lebesgue measure. The integral is also called the weak integral in contrast to the Bochner integral, which is the strong integral.

Definition

Evaluation of a functional may be written as a duality pairing: 

The map  is called  if for all  the scalar-valued map  is a measurable map. 
A weakly measurable map  is said to be  if there exists some  such that for all  the scalar-valued map  is Lebesgue integrable (that is) and 
 

The map  is said to be  if  for all  and also for every  there exists a vector  such that 

simplifies to 

In particular, in this special case,  is weakly integrable on  if and only if  is Lebesgue integrable.

Relation to Dunford integral

 
where  

Identify every vector  with the map scalar-valued functional on  defined by  This assignment induces a map called the canonical evaluation map and through it,  is identified as a vector subspace of the double dual  
The space  is a semi-reflexive space if and only if this map is surjective. 
The  is Pettis integrable if and only if  for every

Properties

The standard estimate  for real- and complex-valued functions generalises to Pettis integrals in the following sense: For all continuous seminorms  and all Pettis integrable   holds. The right hand side is the lower Lebesgue integral of a -valued function, that is,  Taking a lower Lebesgue integral is necessary because the integrand  may not be measurable. This follows from the Hahn-Banach theorem because for every vector  there must be a continuous functional  such that  and for all   Applying this to  it gives the result.

Mean value theorem

An important property is that the Pettis integral with respect to a finite measure is contained in the closure of the convex hull of the values scaled by the measure of the integration domain:

This is a consequence of the Hahn-Banach theorem and generalizes the mean value theorem for integrals of real-valued functions: If  then closed convex sets are simply intervals and for  the following inequalities hold:

Existence

If  is finite-dimensional then  is Pettis integrable if and only if each of 's coordinates is Lebesgue integrable.

If  is a topological space,  its Borel--algebra,  a Borel measure that assigns finite values to compact subsets,  is quasi-complete (that is, every bounded Cauchy net converges) and if  is continuous with compact support, then  is Pettis integrable. 
More generally: If  is weakly measurable and there exists a compact, convex  and a null set  such that  then  is Pettis-integrable.

Law of large numbers for Pettis-integrable random variables

Let  be a probability space, and let  be a topological vector space with a dual space that separates points.

Let 
 
denote the sample average. By linearity,  is Pettis integrable, and 

Suppose that the partial sums 
 

Without further assumptions, it is possible that  does not converge to  To get strong convergence, more assumptions are necessary.

See also

References

 James K. Brooks, Representations of weak and strong integrals in Banach spaces, Proceedings of the National Academy of Sciences of the United States of America 63,  1969, 266–270. Fulltext 
 Israel M. Gel'fand, Sur un lemme de la théorie des espaces linéaires, Commun. Inst. Sci. Math. et Mecan., Univ. Kharkoff et Soc. Math. Kharkoff, IV. Ser. 13, 1936, 35–40 
 Michel Talagrand, Pettis Integral and Measure Theory, Memoirs of the AMS no. 307 (1984) 
 

Functional analysis
Integrals